Leslie Lowe (born 4 February 1948) is a former English cricketer.  Lowe was a right-handed batsman who bowled right-arm medium pace.  He was born in Knypersley, Staffordshire.

Lowe made his debut for Staffordshire in the 1966 Minor Counties Championship against Durham.  Lowe played Minor counties cricket for Staffordshire from 1966 to 1978, which included 27 Minor Counties Championship matches.  In 1975, he made his only List A appearance against Leicestershire in the Gillette Cup.  In this match, he scored 7 unbeaten runs and in the field he took a single catch.

References

External links
Leslie Lowe at ESPNcricinfo
Leslie Lowe at CricketArchive

1948 births
Living people
People from Biddulph
English cricketers
Staffordshire cricketers